Jorge David Castaneda (born October 31, 1996) is an American professional boxer who has held the WBC International Silver super featherweight title since October 2021.

Professional career
Castaneda made his professional debut on August 14, 2015, scoring a third-round knockout (KO) victory against Angel Vargas at Laredo Energy Arena in Laredo, Texas.

After compiling a record of 7–0 (7 KOs), he defeated Ángel Martínez via eighth-round technical knockout (TKO), capturing the vacant WBC Youth Intercontinental super featherweight title on February 10, 2017 at the Laredo Energy Arena. Following a TKO victory against Jose Silveria in a non-title fight in July, Castaneda lost the title in his first defense, suffering a sixth-round TKO loss against Randy Moreno Ochoa on February 9, 2018, at the Laredo Energy Arena.

Following a TKO victory against Carlos Villareal in July, Castaneda defeated José Antonio Martínez via third-round KO on December 7, capturing the inaugural  USA lightweight title at the Sames Auto Arena in Laredo, Texas.

Two fights later he moved back down to super featherweight, defeating Pedro Amigon via eight-round unanimous decision (UD), capturing the inaugural ABF USA title on April 19, 2019, at the Sames Auto Arena.

In his next fight he scored a majority decision (MD) victory against undefeated prospect Otha Jones III in April 2021, before facing another undefeated prospect, Youssef Khoumari, for the vacant WBC International Silver super featherweight title on October 30 at The O2 Arena in London, England. Serving as part of the undercard for Chantelle Cameron vs. Mary McGee, Castaneda defeated Khoumari via ten-round MD, with two judges scoring the bout 97–94 and 96–94 in favour of Castaneda while the third judge scored it a draw at 95–95.

Professional boxing record

References

External links

Living people
1996 births
Boxers from Texas
American male boxers
Super-featherweight boxers
Lightweight boxers